"Six Months in a Leaky Boat" is a song by New Zealand art rock group Split Enz. It was released in May 1982 as the second single from the group's eighth studio album, Time and Tide.  The title is a reference to the time it took pioneers to sail to New Zealand (hence the reference to Aotearoa and The Tyranny of Distance - a history by Geoffrey Blainey), and a metaphor that refers to lead singer Tim Finn's nervous breakdown.

The song became a top-10 hit in Australia, New Zealand and Canada, going on to be voted the fifth-best New Zealand song ever in the 2001 Australasian Performing Right Association list. Its chart performance was less successful in the United Kingdom, owing to its release during the Falklands War. Despite being recorded prior to the outbreak of the conflict, some in Britain considered the song to be veiled criticism of the war with Argentina. The song was consequently removed from many radio play lists in the United Kingdom, including the BBC, since it was considered that references to leaky boats were inappropriate during the naval action in the war.

At the 1982 Countdown Music Awards the song was nominated for Best Australian Single.

Music video
The video shows band members dressed in nautical gear, and Māori artists performing traditional Māori poi dance.

Track listing
"Six Months in a Leaky Boat" 4:21
"Fire Drill" (Australian/NZ release. In most other countries the B-side was "Make Sense of It")

Personnel
 Tim Finn – vocals, piano
 Neil Finn – vocals, guitar
 Noel Crombie – drums, percussion
 Nigel Griggs – bass
 Eddie Rayner – keyboards, percussion

Charts

Weekly charts

Year-end charts

Covers
"Six Months in a Leaky Boat" was covered by Australian indie rock band Little Birdy, and appears on the 2005 compilation album She Will Have Her Way. They also played the song during their set at the Sydney Sound Relief concert.
Australian children's entertainers The Wiggles covered this song on their album/video, It's a Wiggly, Wiggly World, with Tim Finn singing back up and appearing in the video, but with the lyrics significantly altered to be about Captain Feathersword.

Legacy
The song was voted the 5th best New Zealand song of all time in 2001 by members of APRA.

The song was used as the funeral song for explorer, environmentalist and sailor Sir Peter Blake, sung by Tim Finn with acoustic guitar, at Blake's service.

References

Songs about explorers
Songs about boats
Songs about New Zealand
1982 singles
1982 songs
APRA Award winners
Falklands War
Song recordings produced by Hugh Padgham
Songs written by Tim Finn
Split Enz songs